Uusikaupunki Areena is an indoor basketball sporting arena that is located in Uusikaupunki. It is currently home to the Korihait Finnish professional basketball team, which competes in the Korisliiga. It has also been the homecourt of Finland national basketball team for a couple of times.

The arena was opened in the year 1981 and has a seating capacity of 1,507 people. Record attendance is 2,500.

References

External links
Korihait

Indoor arenas in Finland
Buildings and structures in Southwest Finland
Basketball venues in Finland